Gillian Anne Martin is a Scottish politician serving as the Member of the Scottish Parliament (MSP) for the Aberdeenshire East since 2016. A member of the Scottish National Party (SNP), she has served as Convener of the Health, Social Care and Sport Committee since 2021.

Early life
Martin grew up in Newburgh and was educated at Ellon Academy. Her parents have always been politically active. A graduate of the University of Glasgow, she worked as a lecturer in further education for 15 years alongside running her own business in video production and training for the energy sector, however upon election to the Scottish Parliament she ceased operation of this business. She was the manager of an emergency media response team for oil and gas companies for 10 years.

Lecturer
She has worked as a lecturer for 15 years in TV production. She was a lecturer at North East Scotland College.

Political activist
Martin became politically active during the Scottish independence referendum. She helped found Women for Independence (WFI). She was on the WFI executive committee as the member for North East region, and has continued participation as an ordinary member since becoming an MSP.

She joined the SNP on 19 September 2014, on the morning after the Scottish independence referendum. She emerged as a candidate for the Aberdeenshire East constituency of the Scottish Parliament in July 2015. and was selected by local party members the following month. She was elected to serve as MSP in the 2016 Scottish Parliament election. The seat was previously held by Alex Salmond.

Parliamentary work 
Martin brought forward the Seat Belts on School Transport (Scotland) Bill. The purpose of the Bill is to introduce a requirement to Scottish law that all dedicated home-to-school transport service vehicles are fitted with seat belts, as there is presently no UK legal obligation for the provision of seatbelts on such vehicles.

On 27 June 2018 the Scottish Government announced that Martin would be appointed Minister for Further Education, Higher Education and Science. However, following media attention around a series of offensive blogs Martin wrote during her time as a college lecturer, First Minister Nicola Sturgeon subsequently withdrew Martin's nomination when presenting her new ministerial team to the Scottish Parliament for approval. Among the controversial blog entries, Martin mocked trans women as "hairy knuckled lipstick- wearing transitional transgender Laydees". She also wrote of a survey of transgender people, "the EU clearly have a Tranny Trove [of money]". Of Scotland's membership of the United Kingdom she wrote, "Don’t make me trot out the now clichéd comparison to the abused partner in a marriage. Cliché it may be but clichés come from truth." And of African American customers she wrote they were to be, "To be avoided." 

In September 2018, Martin was appointed as Convener of the Environment, Climate Change and Land Reform Committee.

From 2016 to 2018 Martin was co-convenor of the Scottish Parliament cross-party group on Oil and Gas. She has used her time in parliament to highlight the downturn of the oil and gas sector in the North East, and the effect it has had on those living in Aberdeenshire East. Martin has spoken out on behalf of workers who have been discriminated against due to their oil and gas connections, and has been a vocal supporter of the efforts being by the Scottish Government made to assist those facing unemployment.

Personal life
Martin is married to a teacher and has two children. She lives in Newmachar, Aberdeenshire.

Controversies 
In 2018, Martin apologised "unreservedly" for "inappropriate and offensive" remarks she had posted on a blog about transgender people in 2007. On 28 June 2018, she issued a second apology about offensive remarks made a decade earlier about the tipping habits of black customers.

References

External links
 
 profile on SNP website

Year of birth missing (living people)
Living people
People from Formartine
People educated at Ellon Academy
Lecturers
Members of the Scottish Parliament 2016–2021
Members of the Scottish Parliament 2021–2026
Scottish National Party MSPs
Female members of the Scottish Parliament